Sonderdezernat K1 is a German television series.

See also
List of German television series

External links
 

German crime television series
1972 German television series debuts
1982 German television series endings
Television shows set in Hamburg
German-language television shows
Das Erste original programming
1970s German police procedural television series
1980s German police procedural television series